The Vail Lacrosse Shootout is a lacrosse tournament held annually in Vail, Colorado, composed of six age brackets for men- Chumash (Youth), High School (U-19), Elite (19+), Masters (33+), Supermasters (40+) and Grandmasters (50+), and three for women- Chumash, High School and Elite.  Play typically runs from the end of June into the beginning of July.  Games take place in Vail, Avon and Edwards, however most games are in Vail at Ford Field, Donovan Park and Athletic Field.

The inaugural tournament was held in 1973 and the event has become increasingly larger and more popular since.  Participating teams come from all over the nation and world, and are made up of both local and college alumni teams.  Players come from all levels of high school and collegiate play, from Division I, II and III.

Champions prior to 2002 cannot be found on the Vail Lacrosse website and thus are not included in the tables below.  If such information is known then please feel free to add it, however please include the appropriate citations.

High School Boys

2008 Participants
Division I  – Baltimore Crabs, Team Colorado, Colorado Favorites, Team Delaware, Team Indiana, Team Ohio, Triad Lacrosse Club and Team Utah.

Division II – Kansas City, Kansas City Blue Lions, Midwest Elite, Team Nebraska, Sacramento, Sacramento Elite and Winnipeg Wolverines.

Division I Finals History

Division II Finals History

Men's Elite

2008 Participants
Team 21, 5280/Tap Room, AIG-Livestrong, Arizona Mermen, Team Black Seal, Brine Elite, Club All-Stars, Footclan, Generals, Team Gutman, LaxGrip, The Lofers, Merrill Lynch/Lacrossewear, Reebok, Team Rock-it Pocket, Rocky Mountain Oysters, Team Rubi Rey and Team Valhalla.

Finals History

Men's Masters

2008 Participants
Jägermeister, Lacrossewear, Lax Gear/Silver Oysters, Team MAC, Middlebury and Tribe Elders.

Finals History

Men's Supermasters

2008 Participants
Adidas Magic Wands, Arizona Graybirds, Blivet, Colorado Lacrosse Club, Elder Statesmen, Essian/Tap Room, FROGs, Lacrosse.com, Lacrossewear, Middlebury, Team Millennium Rock-it Pocket, Navy, NYAC Founding Fathers, Princeton Obsoletes, Tri-City Canadians and Tsunami/Olde Quakers.

Division I Finals History

Division II Finals History

Men's Grandmasters

2008 Participants
Eldest Statesmen, Gravediggers, Los Viejos de Adidas, Middlebury, Mr. Boh/Nacho Mamas, Navy Grandgoats, Rockies and USA Stars.

Finals History

High School Girls

2008 Participants
Gold Division  – Colorado 1, CTLF, Heros, M&D Lax, PA Express, Puget Sound, Team Texas and TLC.

Silver Division – Bay Area Wave, Team Capital, Lady Blue Knights, MFL Fusion, Minnesota Lakers, Queen City Stars, Triple Threat and Team Utah.

Bronze Division – Colorado 2, Colorado 3, Detroit, Eagle Elite, Indy Girls, Lakeshore and Midwest Elite.

Gold Division Finals History

Silver Division Finals History

Bronze Division Finals History

Women's Elite

2008 Participants
Team 180, AOB, Colorado Chillax, CRSLAX, Dos Brisas Lax, Gang Green, Lax Hut, Lax World Colorado, Merrill Lynch, Minnesota Northstars, QC Lax Midwest, Revolution Lacrosse, Tap Room, Team Wild and Team Xtreme.

Finals History

See also
Lacrosse
NCAA Men's Lacrosse Championship
NCAA Women's Lacrosse Championship
World Lacrosse Championship
Women's Lacrosse World Cup

References

External links
Vail Lacrosse Shootout
US Lacrosse

Lacrosse competitions in the United States
Tourist attractions in Eagle County, Colorado
Sports in Colorado
Lacrosse in Colorado